Biel/Bienne Bözingenfeld/Champ railway station is a railway station in the municipality of Biel/Bienne, in the Swiss canton of Bern. It is an intermediate stop on the Basel–Biel/Bienne and Jura Foot lines, although trains traveling south on the Basel–Biel/Bienne line from Grenchen Nord do not stop here.

The station opened on 15 December 2013. In the planning stages, it was known as Bözingenfeld Ost railway station. The long name of the station is Biel/Bienne Bözingenfeld/Champs-de-Boujean.

Services 
 the following services stop at Biel/Bienne Bözingenfeld/Champ:

References

External links 
 
 

Railway stations in Switzerland opened in 2013
Railway stations in the canton of Bern
Swiss Federal Railways stations
Transport in Biel/Bienne